Agnieszka Yarokhau (née Szwarnóg; born 28 December 1986 in Myślenice) is a Polish race walker. She competed in the 20 km kilometres event at the 2012 Summer Olympics.

References

External links 
 
 
 
 

Polish female racewalkers
1986 births
Living people
Olympic athletes of Poland
Athletes (track and field) at the 2012 Summer Olympics
Athletes (track and field) at the 2016 Summer Olympics
People from Myślenice
Sportspeople from Lesser Poland Voivodeship